Wadla (Amharic: ዋድላ) is a woreda in Amhara Region, Ethiopia. It is named for the former district which lay roughly in the same area. Part of the Semien Wollo Zone, Wadla is bordered on the southeast by Delanta, on the southwest by Dawunt, on the north by Meket, and on the northeast by Guba Lafto. The major town in Wadla is Gashena. Other towns include Kone and Arbit.

The altitude of this woreda ranges from 1700 to 3200 meters above sea level. It lies in the watershed of the Bashilo; rivers include the Zhit'a. Wadla, as well as the other seven rural woredas of this Zone, has been grouped amongst the 48 woredas.

Demographics
With an area of 855.29 square kilometers, Wadla has a population density of 149.86, which is greater than the Zone average of 123.25 persons per square kilometer. A total of 28,414 households were counted in this woreda, resulting in an average of 4.51 persons to a household, and 27,481 housing units. The majority of the inhabitants practiced Ethiopian Orthodox Christianity, with 97.08% reporting that as their religion, while 2.9% of the population said they were Muslim.

The 1994 national census reported a total population for this woreda of 106,681 in 24,473 households, of whom 54,760 were men and 51,921 were women; 1,506 or 1.41% of its population were urban dwellers. The largest ethnic group reported in Wadla was the Amhara (99.94%). Amharic was spoken as a first language by 99.95%. The majority of the population practiced Ethiopian Orthodox Christianity with 96.21% reported to profess this belief, while 3.78% of the population said they were Muslim.

Notes

Districts of Amhara Region